Szeto Wai, CBE, JP (10 April 1913 – 24 July 1991) was a Hong Kong engineer and architect. He was responsible for the design and construction of many buildings of the Chinese University of Hong Kong when he was the university architect from 1963 to 1978, and became known as the "constructor of the CUHK". He was also an unofficial member of the Executive Council and the Legislative Council.

Retirement, death and personal life
Szeto Wai resided in New York City after his retirement in 1987. He died on 24 July 1991 in Paris, France.

References

1913 births
1991 deaths
Members of the Executive Council of Hong Kong
Members of the Legislative Council of Hong Kong
People from Kaiping
Hong Kong architects
Hong Kong engineers
Hong Kong painters
Hong Kong civil servants
Chinese architects
Engineers from Guangdong
Painters from Guangdong
Commanders of the Order of the British Empire
Politicians from Guangdong
Chinese emigrants to British Hong Kong